Rhenium diboride (ReB2) is a synthetic superhard material.  It was first synthesized in 1962 and re-emerged recently due to hopes of achieving high hardness comparable to that of diamond. The reported ultrahigh hardness has been questioned, although this is a matter of definition as in the initial test rhenium diboride was able to scratch diamond.

The production method of this material does not involve high pressures as with other hard synthetic materials, such as cubic boron nitride, which makes production cheap.  However, rhenium itself is an expensive metal.

The compound is formed from a mixture of rhenium, noted for its resistance to high pressure, and boron, which forms short, strong covalent bonds with rhenium.

Synthesis 

ReB2 can be synthesized by at least three different methods at standard atmospheric pressure: solid-state metathesis, melting in an electric arc, and direct heating of the elements.

In the metathesis reaction, rhenium trichloride and magnesium diboride are mixed and heated in an inert atmosphere and the magnesium chloride byproduct is washed away. Excess boron is needed to prevent formation of other phases such as Re7B3 and Re3B.

In the arc-melting method, rhenium and boron powders are mixed and a large electric current is passed through the mixture, also in an inert atmosphere.

In the direct reaction method, the rhenium-boron mixture is sealed in a vacuum and held at a high temperature over a longer period (1000 °C for five days).

At least the last two methods are capable of producing pure ReB2 without any other phases, as confirmed by X-ray crystallography.

Properties 
The hardiness of ReB2 exhibits considerable anisotropy because of its hexagonal layered structure (see structure model), being greatest along the c axis. In contrast to the scratch hardness test, its indentation hardness (HV ~ 22 GPa) is much lower than that of diamond and is comparable to that of tungsten carbide, silicon carbide, titanium diboride or zirconium diboride.

Two factors contribute to the high hardness of ReB2: a high density of valence electrons, and an abundance of short covalent bonds. Rhenium has one of the highest valence electron densities of any transition metal (476 electrons/nm3, compare to 572 electrons/nm3 for osmium and 705 electrons/nm3 for diamond). The addition of boron requires only a 5% expansion of the rhenium lattice, because the small boron atoms fill the existing spaces between the rhenium atoms. Furthermore, the electronegativities of rhenium and boron are close enough (1.9 and 2.04 on the Pauling scale) that they form covalent bonds in which the electrons are shared almost equally.

See also
 Network covalent bonding
 Superhard material

References 

Borides
Rhenium compounds
Superhard materials
Substances discovered in the 1960s